is a town located in Aomori Prefecture, Japan. , the town had an estimated population of 16,885 in 7466 households, and a population density of 110 persons per km2 .

Geography
Nanbu is located in southeastern of Aomori Prefecture, in the eastern part of Sannohe District. The Mabechi River flows from east to west in the center of the town. The terrain is flat along the Mabuchi River, but there are few flatlands and most of the town is hilly. In the southern part of the town,  Mt. Nakui has an elevation of 615 meters.

Neighbouring municipalities
Aomori Prefecture
Sannohe District
Sannohe
Shingō
Gonohe
Hachinohe
Iwate Prefecture
Ninohe
Karumai

Climate
The town has a cold maritime climate characterized by cool short summers and long cold winters with heavy snowfall  (Köppen climate classification Cfa). The average annual temperature in Nanbu is 10.0 °C. The average annual rainfall is 1198 mm with September as the wettest month. The temperatures are highest on average in August, at around 23.0 °C, and lowest in January, at around -2.1 °C.

Demographics
Per Japanese census data, the population of Nambu has declined over the past 60 years.

History
When the Nanbu clan relocated from Kai Province to their holdings in Mutsu Province in the early Muromachi period, they established their residence and clan temple in what is now the town of Nanbu. During the Edo period, the area was controlled by Morioka Domain and later by Hachinohe Domain. Hirasaki and Muko villages were created with the establishment of the modern municipalities system on April 1, 1889. These two villages merged on April 20, 1955 to create the village of Nanbu. Nanbu was elevated to town status on February 11, 1959. On January 1, 2006, Nanbu merged with Fukuchi and Nagawa into the new town of Nanbu.

Government
Nanbu has a mayor-council form of government with a directly elected mayor and a unicameral town council of 16 members. Nanbu is part of Sannohe District which contributes three members to the Aomori Prefectural Assembly. In terms of national politics, the town is part of Aomori 2nd district of the lower house of the Diet of Japan.

Education
Nanbu has eight public elementary schools and four public middle school operated by the town government and one public high school operated by the Aomori Prefectural Board of Education.

Economy
The economy of Nanbu is heavily dependent on agriculture, especially horticulture. The main crops are apples, grapes and European pears.

Transportation

Railway
 Aoimori Railway Company – Aoimori Railway Line
 –  –  –

Highway

Local attractions
Ruins of Shōjujidate Castle, a National Historic Site
Nakuidake Prefectural Natural Park

Noted people from Nanbu
Satoru Sakamoto, musician
Hirotaka Neichi, professional baseball player
Yoshimi Akaishi, voice actor
Tsutomu Sakamoto , cyclist, bronze medal winner in 1984 Summer Olympics

References

External links

 Official Website 

 
Towns in Aomori Prefecture